Pattern-Seeking Animals is an American progressive rock supergroup formed in 2018 by Ted Leonard, Dave Meros, John Boegehold and Jimmy Keegan; all of whom are current and former members and collaborators of fellow progressive rock ensemble Spock's Beard.

Name 
About the band's name, Leonard said in an interview:

History
The band was put together to perform some music that Boegehold had been writing in 2018, with Leonard and Meros co-writing some of the material. They eventually agreed to turn it into a band and now intend to release one album every year and go on tour with additional session musicians.

After signing with Inside Out Music, the band released its first, self-titled album on July 5, 2019. The second album, Prehensile Tales, came out less than a year later, on May 15, 2020, and was positively reviewed by Prog.

Their third album, Only Passing Through, was released on April 1, 2022.

Members
Band members
 Ted Leonard – lead vocals, guitar (2018–present)
 Dave Meros – bass (2018–present)
 John Boegehold – synthesizers, programming, guitar, mandolin (2018–present)
 Jimmy Keegan – drums, backing vocals (2018–present)

Live members
 Dennis Atlas - keyboards, backing vocals (2022–present)
 Walter Ino - keyboards, guitar, backing vocals (2022–present)

Discography
 Pattern-Seeking Animals (2019)
 Prehensile Tales (2020)
 Only Passing Through (2022)

References

External links
 

Rock music supergroups
Musical groups established in 2018
Progressive rock musical groups from California
Inside Out Music artists
2018 establishments in California